"Breaking News" is a song credited to American recording artist Michael Jackson. The song is said to have been written by Jackson, Eddie Cascio and James Porte, produced by Teddy Riley, Cascio and Jackson, and was included on his posthumous album, Michael. Along with "Monster" and "Keep Your Head Up", the song was allegedly recorded in the Porte/Cascios' basement in 2007. These tracks have been controversial since their release, with Jackson's fans and family members doubting their authenticity since release. As of August 2018, there is a pending court case as to whether a Michael Jackson impersonator named Jason Malachi was used for the lead vocal of the song.

The R&B song talks about the media wanting a piece of the pop star, which drew comparisons to Britney Spears' "Piece of Me" (2007). An instrumental snippet "Breaking News" was unveiled in a promotional video which features a montage of various TV journalists reporting breaking news about Jackson, and refers to the tabloid stories and legal troubles that plagued Jackson in the years leading up to his death. "Breaking News" achieved minor success, peaking at number one on the Billboard Bubbling Under Hot R&B/Hip-Hop Songs.

Background 
"Breaking News" is said to have been written by Jackson, Eddie Cascio and James Porte, and produced by Teddy Riley, Cascio and Jackson. The song was released by Sony Music Entertainment to precede the announcement of Michael. On November 5, 2010, a video "teaser" for "Breaking News" was made available on Jackson's official website. The video opens with a montage of various TV journalists reporting breaking news about Jackson. The musical introduction follows, ending before the vocals start. The video refers to the tabloid stories and legal troubles that plagued Jackson in the years leading up to his death. Three days later the full length version of the song appeared on Jackson's website and was subsequently played on some radio stations.

Critical reception 
"Breaking News" received mainly negative reviews from music critics. Terri Thomas, program director of radio station KJLH said, although "people miss Jackson," the song is "hard to compete with his classics and legacy". Skip Dillard of WBLS mentioned, "listeners overall seemed to think that "Breaking News" sounds 'unfinished' and is not a representation of the level of perfection that Michael sought in his music." Ashante Infantry of Toronto Star said "Breaking News" "threatens to diminish the posthumous goodwill afforded the pop star," and "is a self-referential rehash that spotlights all that was wrong with Mike. If Michael is similarly disappointing, Jackson’s label and executors will find a limit to these "Breaking News" lyrics – “No matter what, you just want to read it again/No matter what, you just want to feed it again.”" Darryl Sterdan from QMI Agency said, "the vocals on the verses of the self-referential "Breaking News" seem artificial, as if they were recorded for a different song and heavily manipulated to readjust their pitch and tempo, then buried under layers of overdubs." A review by The Christian Science Monitor said, "[the] new Michael Jackson song prompts more controversy, fans were divided, with many loving the new single and others expressing scepticism." Cameron Adams of Herald Sun said the song "would have no doubt stayed unreleased", if Jackson had not died. Joe Vogel, author of the book Man in the Music: The Creative Life and Work of Michael Jackson, gave the song a positive review, saying, "in spite of the backlash, the content of the song is classic Michael Jackson."

Controversy over authenticity 
The authenticity of "Breaking News", as with other songs allegedly written with Cascio and Porte (like "All I Need", "All Right", "Black Widow", "Burn Tonight", "Let Me Fall in Love", "Ready 2 Win", "Soldier Boy", "Stay" and "Water"), all leaked online, was questioned by Jackson's mother Katherine as well as his sister La Toya, and his nephews T.J., Taj, and Taryll, in addition to many of his fans, who will pass on the album and future projects until this is rectified. AFP reported that it was immediately clouded by questions over whether it was really the singer's voice. Reuters reported that the song was "sparking a new round of controversy over whether the voice is really that of the dead 'Thriller' singer". In a statement, Sony Music Group countered that it had "complete confidence in the results of our extensive research, as well as the accounts of those who were in the studio with Michael, that the vocals on the new album are his own."

On November 11, 2010, Michael Jackson Estate issued a report, stating: "six of Michael’s former producers and engineers who had worked with Michael over the past 30 years — Bruce Swedien, Matt Forger, Stewart Brawley, Michael Prince, Dr. Freeze and Teddy Riley all confirmed that the vocal was definitely Michael." Sony claim two forensic musicologists were hired by Jackson Estate and Epic to perform a waveform analysis, suggesting the vocals were indeed Jackson. Teddy Riley apologized later on Twitter to a fan, saying it was a mistake to be part of this project and that he had been "set up". Jason Malachi, who has been noted as the possible vocalist of this song, said he was not involved in the recording. On January 16, 2011, a statement appeared on Jason's Facebook to confess that he had sung songs on the album. He later claimed that his website, Myspace and Facebook had been hacked. After two hours, his manager Thad Nauden claimed to TMZ that "someone created a phony Facebook page in Jason's name" and "Jason wants everyone to know beyond a shadow of a doubt ... he did not sing a single note on the album."

On August 23, 2018, it was reported that Sony had admitted in court that the vocals on the three Cascio songs were not performed by Jackson and were instead recorded after his death by Malachi, apparently missing the first part of Sony's counsel sentence "[F]or purposes of the argument" which is used in court not to be an admission, but rather a statement of "even if the alleged action happened." However, the next day, Zia Modabber of Sony Music's law firm, Katten Muchin Rosenman, recanted these reports, stating that "no one has conceded that Michael Jackson did not sing on the songs".

On July 6, 2022, Jackson's estate and Sony Music removed the song, along with "Monster" and "Keep Your Head Up", from streaming services Spotify and Apple Music amid the allegations that the vocals are not Jackson's.

Personnel 
Written: Michael Jackson, Eddie Cascio and James Porte
Produced: Teddy Riley, Angelikson and Michael Jackson
Background vocals: Jason Malachi, Michael Jackson and James Porte
Mixed: Jean-Marie Horvat and Teddy Riley
Violin: Mark Cargill, Kathleen Robertson, Susan Chatman, Pamela Gates, Lesa Terry, Marisa McCleod, Richard Adkins, Yvette Devereaux, Jennifer Choi and Nicole Garcia
Viola: Karen Elaine, James “Jimbo” Ross, Cameron Patrick, Darrin McCann and Kaila Potts
Cello: Miguel Martinez, Peggy Baldwin, Nancy Stein-Ross, Ernest Ehrhardt, Giovanna Moraga Clayton and Stepanie Fife
Guitars: Joe Corcoran
"Breaking News" reporter voice: Stuart Brawley
String session: The Benjamin Wright Orchestra
Drum programming: James Porte
Voice talents: Stuart Brawley, Sandy Orkin, Stacey Michaels, Michael Lefevre and Lisa Orkin
Keyboards: James Porte, Eddie Cascio and Stuart Brawley
Programming and finisher: Teddy Riley
Arranger and conductor: Benjamin Wright
Bass: Kevin Brandon and Francis Lui Wu
Bass: Stuart Brawley and James Porte

Other versions 
"Breaking News" (original demo) – 4:07
"Breaking News" (instrumental) – 4:25
"Breaking News" (a cappella) – 3:28

Chart performance 
The song received instant airplay on numerous radio stations on the debut day, as 151 US stations sampled "Breaking News" that day on several formats, from pop and R&B to adult and oldies. A total of 246 plays were recorded on that day, reaching an estimated 2.2 million listeners. Additionally it logged 1.1 million impressions on 52 R&B/Hip-Hop stations after two days of airplay, according to Nielsen BDS. Among all stations monitored by BDS, the song registered 302 plays on 177 stations, amounting to an audience of 2.6 million, since its arrival on November 8, 2010. Drawing a mixed reaction from radio programmers, "Breaking News" bubbled under the Hot R&B/Hip-Hop Songs chart at number one after two days of radio airplay. The song remained on the chart for only one week.

See also 
 List of unreleased Michael Jackson material
 Death of Michael Jackson
 List of works published posthumously

References 

2010 songs
Michael Jackson songs
Songs written by Michael Jackson
Song recordings produced by Michael Jackson
Song recordings produced by Teddy Riley
Songs released posthumously
Songs about the media